The Langfang railway station is a high-speed railway station in Anci District, Langfang, Hebei, situated between Beijing and Tianjin. It is served by the Beijing–Shanghai high-speed railway.

The railway is situated adjacent to Langfang North railway station which is served by conventional trains. An underground passage links the two.

External links

Railway stations in Hebei
Railway stations in China opened in 2011